Salford were a British speedway team from the town of Salford that competed in the English Dirt Track League in the inaugural season of British Speedway in 1929.

Brief history
Salford first competed in the English Dirt Track League (effectively the Northern League) in 1929 when they finished 5th. They were based at Albion Greyhound Racecourse also known as the Salford Albion Stadium in Cromwell Road, Salford.

Season summary

References

Defunct British speedway teams